The Royal Ocean Racing Club is a club in London with a further clubhouse and office in Cowes, Isle of Wight. It was established in 1925 as the Ocean Racing Club, as a result of a race to the Fastnet Rock from Cowes, finishing in Plymouth. It received royal approval by King George V in November 1931 since when it has been known as the Royal Ocean Racing Club.

The RORC is the principal organiser of offshore yacht races in the United Kingdom, including the Fastnet Race, the RORC Caribbean 600, the RORC Transatlantic Race and the quadrennial Round Britain and Ireland Yacht Race. It was also the organiser of the Admiral's Cup and the Commodores' Cup.

RORC was founded to encourage long distance yacht racing and the design, building and navigation of sailing vessels in which speed and seaworthiness are combined.

In co-operation with the offshore racing department of the Yacht Club de France, RORC is responsible for IRC, the principal international handicap system for yacht racing.

References

External links
 Official website
 IRC Rating website
 Fastnet Race website
 RORC Caribbean 600 website
 Round Britain and Ireland Race website
 RORC Transatlantic Race website
 (East Anglian Offshore Racing Association), an alternative UK offshore yacht race organiser 
 JOG (Junior Offshore Group), an alternative UK offshore yacht race organiser

Royal yacht clubs
1925 establishments in England
Gentlemen's clubs in London
Organisations based in England with royal patronage
Yacht clubs in England
Sports clubs established in 1925